Don Cherry (born 1934) is a Canadian hockey commentator, retired player and coach.

Don Cherry may also refer to:
 Don Cherry (singer) (1924–2018), American singer and golfer
 Don Cherry (trumpeter) (1936–1995), American jazz musician 
 Don Cherry (American football) (born 1994), American football linebacker

See also